Furner is a town and locality in the Australian state of South Australia. Furner is a farming community.

The 2016 Australian census which was conducted in August 2016 reports that Furner had a population of 131 people.

Furner is located within the federal division of Barker, the state electoral district of Mackillop and the local government area of the Wattle Range Council.

References

Towns in South Australia
Limestone Coast